George Watson was an Irish Lawn bowls international who competed in the 1934 British Empire Games.

Bowls career
At the 1934 British Empire Games he won the silver medal in the rinks (fours) event with Cecil Curran, Charlie Clawson and Percy Watson.

References

Male lawn bowls players from Northern Ireland
Bowls players at the 1934 British Empire Games
Commonwealth Games silver medallists for Northern Ireland
Commonwealth Games medallists in lawn bowls
Medallists at the 1934 British Empire Games